Jacqueline Mary Hope Benítez (born 6 June 1997) is a Puerto Rican basketball player for KK Šiauliai and the Puerto Rican national team.

She represented Puerto Rico at the 2020 Summer Olympics.

References

External links
James Madison Dukes bioz

1997 births
Living people
Basketball players at the 2020 Summer Olympics
Basketball people from Pennsylvania
American expatriate basketball people in Lithuania
Guards (basketball)
James Madison Dukes women's basketball players
Olympic basketball players of Puerto Rico
Puerto Rican women's basketball players
Siena Saints women's basketball players
Puerto Rican expatriate basketball people in Lithuania